Reuss von Plauen may refer to:

 Reuss Younger Line
 Heinrich Reuß von Plauen